Albert William Burch (October 7, 1883 – October 5, 1926), was a professional baseball player who played outfield from 1906 to 1911 for the St. Louis Cardinals and the Brooklyn Dodgers.

In 611 games over six seasons, Burch posted a .254 batting average (554-for-2185) with 254 runs, 48 doubles, 20 triples, 4 home runs, 103 RBIs, 96 stolen bases, 186 bases on balls, .312 on-base percentage and .299 slugging percentage. He finished his career with a .953 fielding percentage playing at all three outfield positions and first and second base.

References

External links

1883 births
1926 deaths
Sportspeople from Albany, New York
Major League Baseball outfielders
Brooklyn Superbas players
Brooklyn Dodgers players
St. Louis Cardinals players
Baseball players from New York (state)
Poughkeepsie Colts players
Altoona Mountaineers players
Atlanta Crackers players
Louisville Colonels (minor league) players
Toronto Maple Leafs (International League) players
Burials at St. John's Cemetery (Queens)